Pacific Sales is a wholly owned subsidiary of Best Buy based in Torrance, California. They offer mid-range to luxury appliances, bathroom fixtures and home furnishings as well as an assortment of home electronics and other home improvement products.

History 
Pacific Sales was founded in 1960 by Jerry Turpanjian. When Pacific sales was purchased by Best Buy in 2006, the decision was made to keep the brand and company intact, unlike other companies such as Magnolia who was absorbed into the Best Buy brand. Since then, Pacific Sales has opened over 35 stores in California, Nevada and Arizona, and had opened stores within existing Best Buy stores in Texas and Hawaii as well as California, Nevada, Oregon, Georgia, and Arizona to offer higher end appliances than are currently available in Best Buy. As of July 2013, they operate 36 full-assortment stores (those carrying major appliances as well as home electronics and home improvement) in California, Nevada, Arizona and Texas.  In addition to these 36, they also operate 55 appliance-only stores located within existing Best Buy locations in California, Arizona, Hawaii, Texas, Minnesota, Virginia, Maryland, Georgia, and Iowa. Much of the business Pacific Sales does is in bulk as well as builder/contractor sales.

Products 
Pacific sales specializes in luxury appliances and other home furnishings. They carry brands such as Kohler, Hansgrohe, Sony and Pioneer Elite.

References

External links

Best Buy
Consumer electronics retailers in the United States
American companies established in 1960
Retail companies established in 1960
Home improvement retailers of the United States
Companies based in Los Angeles County, California
2006 mergers and acquisitions